Mukarama Abdulai (born 16 October 2002) is a Ghanaian professional footballer who last played as a forward for Spanish club Deportivo Alavés, the Black Maidens and the Ghana women's national team.

College career

University for Development Studies 
In late 2018, Abdulai gained admission into the University for Development Studies (UDS) and joined the school's football team. During the 8th edition of the Ghana University Sports Association (GUSA) mini games in 2019, she led the team to win the female football tournament scoring three goals to win the top scorer and the best player of the tournament accolade.

Tyler Junior College 
In August 2019, she got a scholarship to study at the Tyler Junior College in Texas, USA, whilst pursuing her football career.

During her debut season for the Tyler Junior College women's soccer team, she scored 27 goals and made 13 assists to help the team win the 2019 NJCAA Gulf South District Championship and the NJCAA Women's Soccer Championship, including a brace in the final. After recording three consecutive braces to close out the tournament, she was selected as the Most Valuable Offensive Player of the competition.

In her second season, she scored 23 goals and made 10 assists to help the team win the 2020 NJCAA Gulf South District Championship and the NJCAA Women's Soccer Championship for the second consecutive year. In the finals she scored a brace as Tyler College beat Salt Lake (Utah) 2–0 in the final match of the season to complete the campaign with an 18–0 record. She ended the championship as the top scorer, points leader and was also adjudged the Most Valuable Player.

Club career 
Abdulai joined Ghana Premier League side Northern Ladies FC in 2011 at the age of 9. During the 2020–21 season, on match day 1 she scored a hat-trick in their 3–1 win over Ashtown Ladies on 17 January 2021. She scored two goals in the first half and one in the second half to seal the first win for the club.

On 16 July 2021, Alavés, announced that they had signed Abdulai on a two-year deal and was set to stay with the club until 2023. In January 2023, Abdulai and Alavés announced that she had mutually terminated her contract with the club.

International career 
She captained Ghana's squad during the 2018 FIFA U-17 Women's World Cup in Uruguay, where she won the Golden Boot for her tournament-best seven goals and two assists. She scored a hat-trick in the first match against the host country. In addition, she won the Bronze Ball. After her exploits with the team, she was adjudged the Women's footballer of the Year for 2018 by SWAG, beating Grace Asantewaa and Faustina Ampah to the award.

Abdulai was called up to the senior team ahead of the 2019 WAFU Zone B Women's Cup. She made her debut during the first match of the tournament against Senegal and scored a goal to help Ghana seal a 2–0 victory.

She was named on Ghana U20 side and made captain ahead of a double friendly match against Morocco in November 2020. She made her debut in the first match on 23 November 2020 with Ghana suffering a 1–0 defeat, however in the second match on 30 November, she scored a brace to help Ghana win by 4–0.

Honours 
Ghana

 WAFU Zone B Women's Cup Third place : 2019

Individual 
 FIFA Under 17 Women's World Cup Golden Shoe: 2018
 FIFA Under 17 Women's World Cup Bronze Ball: 2018
 SWAG Women's Footballer of the Year: 2018
Ghana Football Awards Women's Footballer of the Year: 2019
Ghana Football Awards Rising Star Award: 2019

See also
List of Ghana women's international footballers

References

External links 

 

Living people
2002 births
Ghanaian women's footballers
Ghana women's international footballers
Dagomba people
People from Tamale, Ghana
Women's association football forwards
Deportivo Alavés Gloriosas players
Tyler Apaches women's soccer players
Ghanaian expatriate women's footballers
Expatriate women's soccer players in the United States
Expatriate women's footballers in Spain
Ghanaian expatriate sportspeople in Spain
Ghanaian expatriate sportspeople in the United States